In the Hindu epic Mahabharata, Vikarna was the third Kaurava, a son of Dhritarashtra and Gandhari, and a brother to the crown prince Duryodhana. Vikarna is also referred to as the third-most reputable of the Kauravas. Vikarna was the only Kaurava who opposed the humiliation of Draupadi, the wife of his cousins of the Pandavas after Yudhisthira lost her freedom in a game of dice to Duryodhana.

Etymology

The word Vikarna has two meanings. Basically it is made from two words. First word is vinā or vishāla, while second word is karna (. vinā means 'without' and vishāla means 'large'. And karna means 'ears'. So this name contains two meanings. Either it is 'the one who is earless' or 'large eared'. This could say something about his character. It is possible that the name Vikarna basically came from his character of either not listening to anyone(self-esteemed) or who listens and captures wisdom through his (large)ears.

Adolescence

Vikarna was one of Drona's students who excelled in archery like Arjuna. On completing their training, Drona asked the Kauravas to bring him Drupada as a guru dakshina. Duryodhana, Dushasana, Yuyutsu, Vikarna, and the remaining Kauravas with the Hastinapura army attacked Panchala. Their attack was repelled. Vikarna and his brothers were forced to flee and abandon the field. Vikarna was married to Sudeshnavati of Kashi Princess and they had a daughter named Durga. Durga is married to Karna's son, Satyasena.

Game of dice
During the infamous dice game of the Mahabharata, Vikarna raised his voice against the game as a whole, and specifically, at the mistreatment of Draupadi, his sister-in-law. Vikarna echoed the questions Draupadi had already asked the Kuru elders, demanding that her questions be answered. His protests were met with silence, even from the wise elders like Bhishma and Drona.

In the silence, and depending on the version of the story, Karna later rebuked and taunted Vikarna for his outburst. Vikarna quietly replied:

Death
Despite his misgivings, Vikarna fights for Duryodhana during the Kurukshetra War. Bhishma names him as one of the great warriors on the Kaurava side. Mentioned throughout the war, Vikarna has a few notable moments. On the fourth day of the war, he attempts to check Abhimanyu's advance, and is severely repulsed. On the fifth day of the war, he attempts to break the King of Mahismati's defense of the Pandava formation, and is unsuccessful. On the seventh day, he covers the retreat of his brothers from Bhima's rampage. On the same day he stops and repulses Drupada and Shikandi and wounds them badly, causing them to retreat. On the tenth day, he attempts to prevent Arjuna and Shikhandi from reaching Bhishma, but is counter-checked by Drupada.

On the thirteenth day of the war, depending on the version of the story, Vikarna is either a silent bystander in the slaying of Abhimanyu or an active participant. On the fourteenth day, Arjuna navigates the chakravyuha of Drona, in order to reach and kill Jayadratha before sunset. Duryodhana sends Vikarna to check Bhima's advance. Bhima, who had sworn to kill all of Dhritarashtra's true-born sons, calls Vikarna a man of dharma and advises him to step aside. Vikarna replies that even though he knew that the Kauravas would not win a war against a side with Krishna on it, he could not forsake Duryodhana. Pleadingly, Bhima reminds him of the dice game, where Vikarna had criticised his brother. Vikarna replied:

Bhima quickly dispatches Vikarna; in some versions of the story Vikarna asks for Bhima to perform his last rites. His death brings tears to the eyes of Bhima. After his death, Bhima laments:

Analysis
Vikarna is somewhat comparable to Kumbhakarna from the Ramayana. Both Vikarna and Kumbhakarna acknowledged that their elder brother's actions are against dharma but ultimately they remained loyal to Duryodhana and Ravana respectively. Yuyutsu had the same ideology and mindset that of Vikarna. Yuyutsu also felt that Duryodhana's actions are wrong; however, he defected to Pandavas at the onset of Kurukshetra war; Yuyutsu's equivalent in the Ramayana is Vibhishana.

References
Mahabharata by C. Rajagopalachari

Characters in the Mahabharata